John Edwin Windrow (September 26, 1899 – May 26, 1984) was an American educator. He became known as "Mr. Peabody" for his five-decade career at Peabody College in Nashville, Tennessee. He was a critic of Nashville's social ills and intellectual segregation.

Early life
Windrow was born on September 26, 1899, in Eagleville, Tennessee, to John C. Windrow and Sarah Glenn. He graduated from Middle Tennessee State University, and he earned a PhD from Peabody College in 1937.

Career
Windrow first taught in Clarksville and Tullahoma. He spent the rest of his career at Peabody College: first as the secretary of its alumni association in 1925, and later as "director of the Peabody Demonstration School, editor of the alumni magazine, acting chairman of the Department of Education and director of the Division of Public Services." He was the college historian and archivist from 1974 to 1984.

Windrow was opposed to "any emphasis on research at the cost of teaching, and the new trend toward corporation- or government-sponsored research." He was a staunch critic of Peabody's merger with Vanderbilt University, effective in 1979.

Windrow was awarded the honorary title of "ambassador extraordinary" by Peabody's board of trustees in 1972. He became the namesake of a Peabody scholarship with an endowment of $500,000 in 1982.

Windrow authored a book about John Berrien Lindsley, an Antebellum educator who served as the chancellor of the University of Nashville. In a review for The Journal of Southern History, Transylvania University professor F. Garvin Davenport suggested the book was "poorly organized" and he deplored the "lack of careful proof-reading", but he admitted that "certain sections of the study are interesting and informative." Windrow also edited a collection of essays authored by Alfred Leland Crabb, a Peabody professor and novelist. Reviewing it for the Tennessee Historical Quarterly, Professor Robert A. McGaw of Vanderbilt University explained that Windrow started the book with a 22-page introduction about Crabb and Peabody's history, followed by Crabb's essays, including one about William Walker.

Views on Nashville
In 1945, Windrow criticized Nashville's elite for ignoring the city's many ills, including:

Views on I.Q. tests
In a 1965 article for the Peabody Reflector, Windrow argued that intellectual segregation based on IQ tests was un-American. Instead, he argued that schools should give students a chance to develop by studying together regardless of test scores and rankings. He emphasized,

Personal life and death
Windrow married Elizabeth Grigsby. They had a daughter.

Windrow died on May 26, 1984, in Nashville, Tennessee.

Selected works

References

1984 deaths
People from Rutherford County, Tennessee
Middle Tennessee State University alumni
Peabody College alumni
Vanderbilt University faculty
Year of birth uncertain
1899 births